Sruthi Jose (born September 8, 1990), better known by her screen name Sruthi Lakshmi, is an Indian actress acting mainly in Malayalam films and television serials. She is also a trained classical dancer. She received a Kerala state television award for best actress in 2016 for teleserial Pokkuveyil.

Personal life

Sruthi Jose with the screen name Sruthi Lakshmi is born on 8 September 1990 to Jose and cine actress Lissy Jose at Kannur. Her father is from Kannur and mother is from Wayanad.She has an elder sister Sreelaya. She is a practicing Knanaya catholic. After completing her +2 in Science from GHSS Sreekandapuram she went to pursue graduation from Mar Ivanios College, Trivandrum. She is a trained classical dancer. Her elder sister Sreelaya acted in films Kutteem Kolum (2013), Maanikyam (2015), Compartment (2015) and serials Krishnakripasagaram on Amrita TV , Kanmani, Thenum Vayambum on Surya TV, Bhagyadevatha on Mazhavil Manorama, Moonumani on Flowers TV, Priyappettaval on Mazhavil Manorama.  Currently they are settled at Kakkanad, Kochi. Sruthi married Dr. Avin Anto on 2 January 2016. Shruthi and her sister played lead roles in Surya TV serial Thenum Vayambum from 2018 to 2019.

Career

Sruthi Lakshmi started her career as a child artist in the television serial Nizhalukal, written by Ranjith Sankar and telecasted in Asianet in 2000. She has also acted in television serials like Nakshathrangal, Detective Anand etc. She made her film debut by playing the character of Bhama, as one of the three heroines, in the film Romeoo opposite Dileep. She has acted in few albums and attended in popular talk shows like Nammal Thammil (Asianet), Youth Club (Asianet), Sreekandannair Show (Surya TV) etc. She  participated in a popular reality show STAR CHALLENGE on Flowers TV.

Filmography

Films

Television series

Television shows

References

External links
 
 Sruthi Lakshmi biography - Popcorn OneIndia
 Sruthi Lakshmi biography - Metromatinee
 Sruthi Lakshmi biography - Celebrity World

1986 births
Living people
21st-century Indian actresses
Actresses from Kannur
Actresses in Malayalam cinema
Actresses in Malayalam television
Actresses in Tamil cinema
Child actresses in Malayalam cinema
Indian film actresses
Indian television actresses
Kerala State Television Award winners
Actresses in Tamil television